Welcome, Honourable Visitors is a 1958 novel by the French writer Jean Raspail. It tells the story of six foreign tourists who travel in Japan and stay at an inn. It was Raspail's first novel, having previously published several travel books. It was first published as Le Vent des Pins, which is the name of the inn in the story, but changed title when it was republished in 1970.

Publication
The novel was first published in 1958 by éditions Julliard with the title Le Vent des Pins. An English translation by Jean Stewart was published in 1960. In the United Kingdom it was published by Hamish Hamilton as Welcome, Honourable Visitors and in the United States by G. P. Putnam's Sons as Welcome Honorable Visitors. It was republished in French in 1970 as Bienvenue honorables visiteurs.

Reception
John Coleman reviewed the book in The Spectator: "M. Raspail is quite astute, works his expected ironies neatly enough, and would probably have made more money publishing the local colour bits as articles in Life."

References

External links
 Le Vent des Pins at the author's website 
 Bienvenue honorables visiteurs at the author's website 

1958 French novels
French-language novels
Novels by Jean Raspail
Novels set in Japan
1958 debut novels
Japan in non-Japanese culture